Thomas Lavault (born 3 May 1999) is a French professional rugby union player who plays as a lock for Top 14 club Stade Rochelais.

Honours

Club 
 La Rochelle
European Rugby Champions Cup: 2021–2022

References

External links
Stade Rochelais profile

1999 births
Sportspeople from Deux-Sèvres
Living people
French rugby union players
Stade Rochelais players
Rugby union locks
20th-century French people
21st-century French people